The FIL European Luge Championships 2002 took place in Altenberg, Germany.

Medalists

Medal table

References

FIL European Luge Championships
2002 in luge
Luge in Germany
2002 in German sport
International sports competitions hosted by Germany
January 2002 sports events in Europe